Mercedes María Paz (born 27 June 1966) is a former professional tennis player from Argentina. She won three singles titles on the WTA Tour and reached a career-high ranking of world No. 28 in April 1991. Her best Grand Slam result was the fourth round at the 1986 French Open and the 1990 French Open.

Paz unexpectedly defeated defending champion Arantxa Sánchez Vicario in the second round of the 1990 French Open. Later that year, at the Virginia Slims of Worcester, Paz also defeated Sánchez Vicario in the round of 16. Five years before, in the semifinals of the 1985 Brazil Open, she beat top-seeded Gabriela Sabatini en route to beating Peruvian Laura Arraya for the title. In so doing, Paz became the first Argentinian woman to capture a major WTA event. In addition to wins over Sánchez Vicario and Sabatini, she also defeated top-seeded Jana Novotná in three sets to reach the semifinals of the Belgian Ladies Open in Brussels in 1989. The previous year, at the 1988 Hilton Head tournament, Paz had defeated Novotná in the round of 32 for the first time.

WTA career finals

Singles 6 (3 titles, 3 runner-ups)

Doubles 40 (22 titles, 18 runner-ups)

ITF Circuit finals

Singles (2–3)

Doubles (9–3)

Notes

External links
 
 
 

1966 births
Living people
Argentine female tennis players
Olympic tennis players of Argentina
Sportspeople from Tucumán Province
Tennis players at the 1984 Summer Olympics
Tennis players at the 1988 Summer Olympics
Tennis players at the 1992 Summer Olympics
Tennis players at the 1995 Pan American Games
US Open (tennis) junior champions
Grand Slam (tennis) champions in girls' doubles
Pan American Games medalists in tennis
Pan American Games gold medalists for Argentina
Competitors at the 1982 Southern Cross Games
South American Games gold medalists for Argentina
South American Games silver medalists for Argentina
South American Games medalists in tennis
Tennis players at the 1983 Pan American Games
Medalists at the 1995 Pan American Games